Suzanne Fortin-Duplessis (born 30 June 1940) is a Canadian retired Senator and former Progressive Conservative member of the House of Commons of Canada. She was a teacher by profession.

Early life
She studied at the École des Beaux-Arts in Quebec City followed by studies at Université Laval where she received a Bachelor of Arts degree for visual arts with an educational psychology certificate. Fortin-Duplessis became a teacher after this.

Member of Parliament
She was the first female elected municipal councillor in Sainte-Foy, Quebec in 1981.

Fortin-Duplessis represented the Quebec riding of Louis-Hébert where she was first elected in the 1984 federal election and re-elected in 1988, becoming part of Brian Mulroney's governing party during the 33rd and 34th Canadian Parliaments.

Fortin-Duplessis left federal politics after her defeat in the 1993 federal election by Philippe Paré of the Bloc Québécois.

Return to politics
Both Fortin-Duplessis and former colleague Pierre H. Vincent managed the Conservative campaign in Quebec in the federal election of 2008.

Prime Minister Stephen Harper appointed Fortin-Duplessis to the Senate on 22 December 2008. She retired on June 30, 2015 upon reaching the mandatory retirement age of 75.

References

External links
 

1940 births
Canadian senators from Quebec
Women members of the House of Commons of Canada
Women members of the Senate of Canada
Conservative Party of Canada senators
French Quebecers
Living people
Members of the House of Commons of Canada from Quebec
Politicians from Saguenay, Quebec
Progressive Conservative Party of Canada MPs
Women in Quebec politics
Quebec municipal councillors
Women municipal councillors in Canada
21st-century Canadian politicians
21st-century Canadian women politicians
Université Laval alumni